Shuo is a given name. Notable people with the name include:

 Cao Shuo (born 1991), Chinese track and field athlete
 Fang Shuo (born 1990), Chinese basketball player
 Jiang Shuo (born 1958), Chinese skulptor
 Wang Shuo (born 1958), Chinese author, director and actor

Chinese given names